Late Night Tales: MGMT is a mix album compiled by the band MGMT's members Andrew VanWyngarden and Ben Goldwasser and released on October 3, 2011. The album is the 25th in the Late Night Tales series.

According MGMT, "The band's Late Night Tales selection of post-punk, cult indie and counter-culture figureheads reflects the band's multifaceted sound, and draws comparisons with contemporary dreampop/chillwave/shoegaze/folk scenes on both sides of the Atlantic."

Their compilation features tracks from artists such as the Velvet Underground, Felt, Suicide, Spacemen 3, and Disco Inferno. It also features an exclusive MGMT's cover of the Bauhaus song "All We Ever Wanted Was Everything" from their 1982 album The Sky's Gone Out.

History
On October 3, 2011, an animated music video was released for MGMT's cover "All We Ever Wanted Was Everything," directed by Ned Wenlock for Hoverlion.

On October 24, 2011 the light used in the MGMT Late Night Tales album artwork was released for consumer purchase.

Track listing

References

External links
Official MGMT site
Official MGMT late Night Tales Page

2011 compilation albums
MGMT
MGMT albums